Xiaohongmen Area is an area and township on the southern part of Chaoyang District, Beijing, China. It borders Shibalidian Township to the northeast, Yizhuang Township to the southeast, Jiugong Township to the southwest, Dahongmen, Dongtiejiangying Subdistricts and Nanyuan Township to the northwest. In the year 2020, it has a total population of 83,675.

The subdistrict was named after Xiaohongmen, a former city gate during the Ming and Qing dynasty.

History

Administrative Divisions 
At the end of 2021, there are 14 subdivisions within Xiaohongmen, where 10 are communities and 4 are villages:

See also 
 List of township-level divisions of Beijing

References

Chaoyang District, Beijing
Areas of Beijing